Cheju Halla University is a private university in Jeju City, the principal city of South Korea's island province of Jeju Province. Originally established as a nursing school, it retains a strong emphasis on medicine, although academic programs in many other fields are now offered.

History
The school began its existence in 1966 as Jeju Nursing School (제주간호학교), a three-year technical institution. It became Jeju Technical College of Nursing in 1979, Halla Technical College in 1991, and took on its present name in 1998.

2000–

 2013 
 Approved for operating bachelor's degree courses and Associate of Arts degree courses simultaneously for the first time in Korea.
2012
 Designated as an institution evaluation certified university (Korea Council for University College Education)
 Designated as a Superior College for Education Capacity Strengthening Project 5 years in a row (The ministry of Education, Science, and Technology)
 Designated as a LINC (Leaders in INdustry-university Cooperation) (The ministry of Education, Science, and Technology)
2011 
 Designated as a central university for lifelong education in relation to 2011 university lifelong education activation support project (National Institute for Lifelong Education)
 Leading college production project in overseas students Education collaborating with international industrial bodies (The ministry of Education, Science, and Technology) 
 Designated for WCC (World Class College)
 Changed name as Cheju Halla University
 Approved for establishing 4 year Bachelors Course in the dept. of Nursing
2010
 overseas employment agreement with Shiga Koken Hotel Association, Japan 
 An employment agreement with Jeju Tourism Organization
 Selected as Outstanding College by the Korea Foundation for the Promotion of Private Schools 
 Host to the Jeju Free International City Cultural Tourism Academic Symposium
2008
 Operation of joint education program with Nursing School at Newcastle University, Australia
 2008 Excellent College for Graduate Employment Award (Ministry of Education, Science and Technology)
 Approval for operation of bachelor's degree programs - Dept. of Tourism and Dept. of Computers and Communications Technology
 Selected for support in providing suitable employment for graduating female students (Ministry of Gender Equality and Family)
 Selected as the 2009 Best Career Support College (Ministry of Labor)
 A MOU with Swiss School of Tourism and Hospitality (SSTH) to provide dual-degree program
 A MOU with the University of Chichester to provide a collaborative education program and a dual degree program
2005
 Support for program of restructuring academic curriculum for IT majors (Ministry of Information and Communication) 
 Extension of program for supporting cultural-content organizations (Ministry of Culture and Tourism) 
 Sponsor college for New University for Regional Innovation (NURI) program (Ministry of Education and Human Resources Development)
 Sponsor college for Regional Innovation System (RIS) (Ministry of Commerce, Industry and Energy) 
 Specialized College in Generating Student Potential in Digital Content Award (Ministry of Commerce, Industry and Energy)
2003
 Special recognition for practicing 'simulation learning system' to enhance student capability in nursing and public health (Ministry of Education and Human Resources Development)
 Special recognition for nurturing experienced and professional human resources through the 'Problem Based Learning' (PBL) method (Ministry of Education and Human Resources Development)
 Award for Industry-Demand Structured Education System (Ministry of Education and Human Resources Development)
 Special recognition for excellence in hosting vocational high school open contests (Ministry of Education and Human Resources Development)
2002
 Special recognition for the Problem Based Learning method (Ministry of Education and Human Resources Development)
 Excellent College for Industry-Demand Education Award (Ministry of Education and Human Resources Development)
 Award for Excellence in Hosting Vocational High School Open Contests (Ministry of Education and Human Resources Development)
2001
 Special recognition for adoption of the Problem Based Learning (PBL) method (Ministry of Education and Human Resources)
2000
 Establishment of Emergency Medicine Education Center and Excellent Management Award (Ministry of Education and Human Resources Development)
1999
 Culinary Arts Department receives Excellence in Specialization Award (Ministry of Education and Human Resources Development) 
 International Tourism Education Award (Ministry of Education and Human Resources Development)
1998
 School name changed to Cheju Halla College
 Nursing and Health Care Personnel Education Award (Ministry of Education and Human Resources Development)
1991
 School name changed to Halla Junior College
1985
 Campus moves to 1534 Nohyeong-dong, Cheju City
1982
 Ownership transferred to Halla Foundation
1972
 Government Authorization for Cheju Nursing Junior College Cheju Nursing Junior College opened
1973
 Cheju Nursing Academy opened
1969
 Government authorization for the establishment of a Public Junior Nursing Academy

Departments
School of Nursing

School of Health Sciences

International School of Tourism & Hospitality

School of Social Welfare

School of Information Technology & Architecture

School of Equine Science

School of Arts

See also
List of colleges and universities in South Korea
Education in South Korea

External links
Official school website, in English

Universities and colleges in Jeju Province
Nursing schools in South Korea
Educational institutions established in 1966
1966 establishments in South Korea